The Tower of London is a former Royal residence in London.

Tower(s) of London may also refer to:

Geography
Tower of London Range, Northern Rockies, Canada
London Tower (Alaska), a mountain in Denali National Park

Arts, media, and entertainment

Films
Tower of London (1939 film)
 Peter Pan (1953 film) as an animated model of the building
Tower of London (1962 film)
Mary Poppins (1964 film) as Peter Ellenshaw's Cloudy London set
Carry On Henry seen in the opening credits and the closing titles

Literature
The Tower of London (novel), a 19th-century novel by William Harrison Ainsworth
, a short story by Natsume Soseki

Music
Towers of London (band)
"Towers of London" (song)
"Tower of London", a song by ABC from the album How to Be a ... Zillionaire!

Television
"Tower of London" (The Goodies), an episode of The Goodies

Other uses
Tower of London test, a neuropsychological test